The E.W. McClellan House is a historic house a short way southwest of the center of Canehill, Arkansas, off Arkansas Highway 45.  The house is a two-story I-house, with a side gable roof and a prominent two-story gable-roofed portico at the center of its front facade.  Its main entrance is flanked by sidelight windows and topped by a transom.  Despite a post-Civil War construction date (c. 1866), the building features pre-war Greek Revival styling.  There are 20th-century additions to the rear of the house.

E. W. McClellan was a merchant who moved to Western Arkansas in 1833. He was a member of the board of trustees of Cane Hill College.

The house was listed on the National Register of Historic Places in 1982.

See also
National Register of Historic Places listings in Washington County, Arkansas

References

Houses on the National Register of Historic Places in Arkansas
Greek Revival houses in Arkansas
Houses completed in 1866
Houses in Washington County, Arkansas
1866 establishments in Arkansas
National Register of Historic Places in Washington County, Arkansas